Poppy Factory were an English indie rock band from Bradford, England, signed to Chrysalis Records. They released one EP and three singles.  Their debut, the Fabulous Beast EP, met critical acclaim and was played by a number of radio DJs and stations (it was notably thrashed by Rock FM's Tim Lancaster), though its chart performance did not match industry reception. Next came the 7-inch "Stars", and then "7x7" (composers Cotton/Dale/MacDonald), produced by David Creffield.

The band's contract with Chrysalis foundered, and they self-released a 12-inch promo, "Drug House" before fading into obscurity.

The band's frontman Mickey Dale later rose to fame as the keyboard player for Embrace.

References

English indie rock groups
Musical groups from Bradford
Chrysalis Records artists